Scott Zwizanski (born May 29, 1977 in West Chester, Pennsylvania) is an American cyclist. He won the Tour de Beauce in 2009.

Palmarès

2003
1st Tour of Christiana
1st stage 2
2004
2nd overall Tobago Cycling Classic
2005
1st Tour of Medford, New Jersey
2007
1st stage 5 Tour of Southland
2008
1st Bank of America Wilmington
2009
2nd stage La Primavera at Lago Vista
1st Vuelta Ciclista del Uruguay
1st stage 7
1st Tour de Beauce:
1st stage 4
3rd overall U.S. Air Force Classic
3rd United States National Time Trial Championships
2010
2nd overall Nature Valley Grand Prix
1st stage 1 Nature Valley Grand Prix (time trial)

References

External links

 

1977 births
Living people
American male cyclists